Joseph Francis Joy (September 13, 1883 – February 1957) was born in the small mining town of Cumberland, Maryland.  Joy is known for being an inventor.  He accumulated 190 patents in his lifetime.

His major inventions were recognized as milestones in the history of underground mining mechanization. He had pioneered new concepts in hydraulics, modern control and power circuits, trackless mining equipment, efficient gearing and seal designs as well as dozens of other "firsts" in the industry. His contributions changed forever the way minerals are mined.

Joy is also known for founding the company that bears his name: Joy Mining Machinery.

Notes

External links 
Joy Mining Machinery History
Joy Manufacturing Company records (1915-1989) at Hagley Museum and Library

1883 births
1957 deaths
American mining engineers
People from Cumberland, Maryland
20th-century American inventors